Kynsailang Khongsit (born 11 December 2000) is an Indian professional footballer who plays as a defender for Sreenidi Deccan FC in the I-League.

Career
Born in Shillong, Meghalaya, Khongsit was part of the youth side of Royal Wahingdoh before moving to I-League club Shillong Lajong in the summer of 2017. While with Wahingdoh, Khongsit was part of their squad for the I-League U18 and was sent abroad to Spain for training.

Shillong Lajong
On 6 August 2017, he was announced as part of the Shillong Lajong senior side for the Shillong Premier League. A few months later, Khongsit was also included in the first-team squad for the 2017–18 I-League. He soon made his professional debut, at the age of 16, in the club's opening match of the season against Gokulam Kerala. He started the match at left back and played 73 minutes as Shillong Lajong won 1–0.

Hyderabad FC 
On 26 January 2020 , Khongsit joined Indian Super League club Hyderabad FC.

Career statistics

References

2000 births
Living people
People from Shillong
Indian footballers
Royal Wahingdoh FC players
Shillong Lajong FC players
Association football defenders
Footballers from Meghalaya
I-League players
Indian Super League players
Hyderabad FC players
Sreenidi Deccan FC players